John Warren (1767-1838)  was Dean of Bangor from 1793 to 1838.

Warren was educated at Jesus College, Cambridge. A prebendary of Lichfield, he died on 16 February 1838.

References

1767 births
Alumni of Jesus College, Cambridge
18th-century Welsh Anglican priests
19th-century Welsh Anglican priests
1838 deaths
Deans of Bangor